Devtoli (Hindi: देवटोली) is a mountain of Kumaon Himalaya located in the Bageshwar district of Uttarakhand,India. It is 36th highest located entirely within Uttarakhand. Nanda Devi is the highest mountain in this category. It is located at the southern rim of Nanda Devi Sanctuary. Devtoli is located just north west of Maiktoli and east of Mrigthuni. On the north east side lies Nanda Devi and Panwali Dwar on the east side. Tharkot on the southern side.

Climbing history

In 1974 A six-member team led by Harish Kapadia "The Mountaineers" from Mumbai achieved the first ascent in their name. on 13 June Harish Kapadia and Mahesh Desai Reached the summit at 1 p.m. while returning Harish Kapadia met with an accident and had rescued by Indian Army helicopter. In 1979 A Japanese expedition led by Fujiro Konno, climbed Devtoli.

Glaciers and rivers
It is surrounded by glaciers with Dakshini Rishi Glacier on the northern side and Sundardunga Glacier on the southern side. Pindari River emerges from southern side of Devtoli while on the northern side is Rishi Ganga. Rishi Ganga met with Dhauliganga near lata. Later Dhauli ganga met with Alaknanda at Vishnu Pryag. Pindari river also met with Alaknanda at Karan Pryag. Alaknanda river is one of the main tributaries of Ganga.

Neighboring peaks
neighboring peaks of Maiktoli: 
 Nanda Devi: 
 Trisul: 
 Devistan: 
 Maiktoli: 
 Tharkot:

See also

 List of Himalayan peaks of Uttarakhand

References

Mountains of Uttarakhand
Six-thousanders of the Himalayas
Geography of Chamoli district